The 1995 Fresno State Bulldogs football team represented California State University, Fresno as a member of the Western Athletic Conference (WAC) during the 1995 NCAA Division I-A football season. Led by 18th-year head coach Jim Sweeney, Fresno State compiled an overall record of 5–7 with a mark of 2–6 in conference play, tying for seventh place in the WAC. The Bulldogs played their home games at Bulldog Stadium in Fresno, California.

Schedule

Team players in the NFL
The following were selected in the 1996 NFL Draft.

References

Fresno State
Fresno State Bulldogs football seasons
Fresno State Bulldogs football